The Five Towns is an informal grouping of villages and hamlets in Nassau County, United States on the South Shore of western Long Island adjoining the border with Queens County in New York City. Although there is no official Five Towns designation, "the basic five are Lawrence, Cedarhurst, Woodmere, Hewlett and Inwood." Each of these "towns" has a consecutive stop on the Far Rockaway Branch of the Long Island Rail Road. All five communities are part of the Town of Hempstead. Woodmere is the largest and most populous community in the Five Towns, while Inwood is the second largest community in the Five Towns. 

The area also includes some unincorporated communities and two tiny villages, Hewlett Bay Park and Woodsburgh, that are not added to the final total. Despite the name, none of these communities is a town. The Five Towns is usually said to comprise the villages of Lawrence and Cedarhurst, the hamlets of Woodmere and Inwood, and "The Hewletts,” which consist of the villages of Hewlett Bay Park, Hewlett Harbor, and Hewlett Neck, and the hamlet of Hewlett, along with Woodsburgh.

North Woodmere is technically one of the "Five Towns" as it is served by the Five Towns' two local high schools and its constituents use the "Five Towns" many public services. Others do not consider it to be part of the "Five Towns," as it is a section of Valley Stream, separated from the rest of the Five Towns by Motts Creek. Atlantic Beach, which is located across a drawbridge from Lawrence on a barrier island it shares with Long Beach, Lido Beach and Point Lookout, is culturally linked to the Five Towns, with its students attending Five Towns public schools, but it is usually — though not always — excluded from the designation.

History
The name "Five Towns" dates back to 1931, when individual Community Chest groups in the area banded together to form the "Five Towns Community Chest", consisting of Inwood, Lawrence, Cedarhurst, Woodmere, and Hewlett. The organization still exists (as of 2018) as a local charity, but the "Five Towns" moniker caught on as a designation for the entire area. A 1933 article in The New York Times references a Girl Scouts of the USA encampment by the "Five Towns Council, embracing the villages of Inwood, Lawrence, Cedarhurst, Woodmere and Hewlett", listed in order by LIRR station.

One notable characteristic of the Five Towns is that despite the reputation of the South Shore of Nassau County being more urbanized than the North Shore, the Five Towns retains hamlets that resemble areas along Long Island's Gold Coast on the North Shore with enormous mansions and exclusive private communities 
along the water. The New York Times used the term "affluent" in describing the area.  Inwood, however, is much less affluent than the other "towns," with a more urban character and a significantly more ethnically diverse population.

Education
There are two school districts in the Five Towns, the Lawrence Public Schools (District 15) and the Hewlett-Woodmere School District (District 14). Roughly speaking, the Lawrence school district contains all of Lawrence, Cedarhurst and Inwood, and parts of Woodmere, North Woodmere, and Woodsburgh, while the Hewlett-Woodmere district contains all of Hewlett and part of Woodmere and extends partly into the neighboring villages of Lynbrook and Valley Stream (North Woodmere and Gibson in particular).

In addition, there are many private schools in the Five Towns. Among them are the independent school, Lawrence Woodmere Academy, and Jewish schools, Hebrew Academy of the Five Towns and Rockaway (HAFTR), Hebrew Academy of Long Beach (HALB), and Yeshiva of South Shore.

Five Towns College
Although Lawrence was planned to be the location for Five Towns College, the original site was no longer available by the time the school received its charter in 1972. The college is currently located in Dix Hills, Suffolk County. Other than the proposed original site, the school never had a physical connection to the Five Towns.

Publications 
As of February 2019, the Five Towns has a weekly local publication: The Nassau Herald

In popular culture
 The 1993 movie Amongst Friends, by Rob Weiss, was filmed and set in the Five Towns.
The television show Entourage features a fictional show titled Five Towns, in which Johnny Drama stars as a character. The producer of the show was supposed to be actor-director Edward Burns, who in real life grew up in Valley Stream but attended Hewlett High School. When shown on Entourage the Five Towns is oddly portrayed as a gritty industrial area. 
In Thomas Pynchon's 1963 debut novel V., he mentions the Five Towns; however, he includes Malverne as being part of the group.
 In the film Goodfellas, when trying to get Henry to come along on a double date, Tommy mentions that his date lives in the Five Towns.
 Opening scene to Married to the Mob was filmed at the Cedarhurst train station (but with the trains going in the reverse direction per the director's decision).

Notable people
Notable current and former residents of the Five Towns include:

 Henry Abramson (born 1963), dean of the Lander College of Arts and Sciences
 Lyle Alzado (1949–1992), former NFL football player.
 Bruce Blakeman, Politician, Member of the Board of Commissioners of the Port Authority of New York and New Jersey.
 Lil Tecca (born 2002), rapper.
 Ross Bleckner (born 1949), artist.
 Jake Burton Carpenter (1954–2019), / founder and owner of Burton Snowboards.
 Michael Cohen (born 1966), former attorney and former lawyer for President Trump.
 Howard Deutch (born 1950), movie director
 John DiResta, actor / comedian
 Debra Drimmer, VP of Talent, Comedy Central
 Gordon Edelstein, Artistic Director of the Long Wharf Theatre in New Haven, Connecticut
 David Friedman (born 1958), former US Ambassador to Israel
 Jane Friedman, President and CEO, HarperCollins
 Jeffrey M. Friedman (born 1954), molecular geneticist and discoverer of leptin.
 James E. Gaffney, owner of the Boston Braves baseball team, winners of the 1914 World Series
 Lisa Glasberg (born 1956), NYC radio DJ
 Barbara Gaines, Producer, Late Show with David Letterman, Emmy Award Winner
 Rande Gerber, nightclub owner married to Cindy Crawford
 Brent Glass, director of the Smithsonian National Museum of American History
 Louise Glück, Poet, Pulitzer Prize for Poetry in 1993, United States Poet Laureate 2003-04, Nobel Laureate in Literature 2020
 Carolyn Gusoff, WNBC news anchor
 Joan Hamburg, radio personality
 Mickey Hart, drummer of The Grateful Dead
 Karen Friedman Hill, who married Mobster Henry Hill – whose life was immortalized by Nicholas Pileggi's book Wiseguy and Martin Scorsese's 1990 film Goodfellas – hailed from Five Towns, and the newlyweds initially lived there with Karen's parents.
 Red Holzman (1920–1998), New York Knicks head coach.
 David M. Israel, TV producer/writer
 Donna Karan (born 1948), fashion designer.
 Aline Kominsky-Crumb, comics artist
 Stan Lee, Marvel comics writer, co-creator of Spider-Man and other comic characters, actor
 Peggy Lipton (born 1946), actress
 Steve Madden (born 1958), shoe designer.
 Gene Mayer, professional tennis player.
 Harvey Milk (1930–1978), first openly gay man to be elected to public office in the United States, as a city supervisor in San Francisco.
 Bruce Murray, host Murray in the Morning radio show
 Danny Porush investment banker/entrepreneur
 Evan Roberts (born 1983), WFAN host.
 Seth Rudetsky (born 1967), composer, musical director and talk show host.
 Jim Steinman (1947–2021), music producer and composer, best known for working with Meat Loaf, Celine Dion and Bonnie Tyler.
 Rob Weiss, director/producer Amongst Friends, Entourage.
 Stuart Weitzman (born 1941), shoe designer
 Leslie West (born 1945), musician of the hard rock group Mountain.
 Alan Zweibel (born 1950), writer / producer.

References

External links

 Archive.org: History of the Rockaways from 1685 to 1917 — free download; includes the Five Towns history.

 
Hempstead, New York
Hamlets in Nassau County, New York
Villages in Nassau County, New York
Jewish communities in the United States